Marco Vinicio Vargas Pereira  (born August 30, 1954) is a Costa Rican politician. He was Deputy Minister of Foreign Affairs of Costa Rica.

References

1954 births
Living people
Costa Rican politicians
Ambassadors of Costa Rica to Uruguay